Rumours (French: Rumeurs) is a 1947 French crime drama film directed by Jacques Daroy and starring Jacques Dumesnil, Jany Holt and Roger Karl. The film's sets were designed by the art director Claude Bouxin.

Synopsis
In a small town in Provence, the killing of a promiscuous local woman leads to suspicions against the town's garage  mechanic. While the police are unable to prove anything against him, the violent rumours that spread around the area begin to drive him out of his mind and he begins to believe he really is murderous.

Cast
 Jacques Dumesnil as 	Jean
 Jany Holt as 	Aline
 Roger Karl as 	Le patron
 Pierre Palau as Le coiffeur	
 Annette Poivre as La serveuse	
 Henri Arius as Le maire
 Lucien Callamand as 	Dufour
 Pierre Clarel as 	Le braconnier
 Fransined as Le garçon de café
 Jérôme Goulven as 	François
 Serge Grave as 	Le mécano
 Georges Hubert as 	Le garagiste
 Annie Hémery as 	Marthe
 Janine Viénot as 	Rose

References

Bibliography
 Barrot, Olivier & Chirat, Raymond. Noir et blanc: 250 acteurs du cinéma français, 1930-1960. Flammarion, 2000.

External links 
 

1947 films
French drama films
1940s French-language films
1947 drama films
1947 crime films
French crime films
Films directed by Jacques Daroy
Films set in Provence-Alpes-Côte d'Azur
1940s French films